Randle John Montgomery (born August 12, 1947) was a National Football League cornerback and kick returner for the Denver Broncos and Chicago Bears. After going to high school at Cleveland (Seattle, WA), Montgomery attended Everett JC and Weber State University.  Montgomery made his professional debut in the NFL in 1971 with the Denver Broncos. He later played with the Chicago Bears. Over his 4-year career he played in 40 games at cornerback, starting 10. He also played several games at kick returner.

Statistically, 1972 was Randy Montgomery's best year, as he had 756 kick return yards and ran back a kickoff for a touchdown.

Stats

References

1947 births
American football cornerbacks
American football return specialists
Chicago Bears players
Denver Broncos players
Living people
People from Houston
Weber State Wildcats football players